Nathan Adewale Temitayo Tella (born 5 July 1999) is an English professional footballer who plays as a midfielder for Championship club Burnley, on loan from Premier League club Southampton.

Career

Early career
Nathan Tella grew up in Stevenage, Hertfordshire and was educated at Edwinstree middle school and then Freman College, both in the town of Buntingford. He left following his GCSE Exams in 2015.

After ten years with Arsenal, Tella spent time on trial at Reading and Norwich City before joining Southampton in April 2017.

Southampton 
In July 2019, he extended his contract with the club for a further year, before signing a further three-year extension in July 2020.

On 19 June 2020, Tella made his senior debut as a substitute in Southampton's 3–0 win over Norwich City. On 11 February 2021, he made his first goal contribution by providing an assist to Stuart Armstrong's goal in a 2–0 FA Cup fifth round win against Wolverhampton Wanderers. On 23 February, Tella made his first Premier League start in a 3–0 defeat to Leeds United. On 15 May, Tella scored his first Premier League goal in a 3–1 win against Fulham.

On 6 January 2022, Tella signed a new three-and-a-half contract with Southampton, which will see him remain at the club until 2025.

Burnley (loan) 
On 11 August 2022, Tella joined Burnley on a season-long loan. On 11 February 2023, he scored a first career hat-trick in a 3–0 victory over Preston North End, his side's tenth consecutive league victory, and a month later scored a second hat-trick in a 3–1 victory over Hull City.

Personal life
Born in England, Tella is of Nigerian descent.

Career statistics

References

External links
Profile on Southampton F.C. website

1999 births
Living people
People from Stevenage
Footballers from Hertfordshire
English footballers
English people of Nigerian descent
Association football midfielders
Arsenal F.C. players
Southampton F.C. players
Burnley F.C. players
Premier League players
English Football League players
Black British sportsmen